Fred J. Luter Jr. (born 1956 November 11 in New Orleans) is a former president of the Southern Baptist Convention (SBC). He was elected on 2012 June 19, and was SBC's first African-American president. According to Southeastern Baptist Theological Seminary president Daniel L. Akin, ". . . the most significant event to happen in our [SBC's] history since our formation" is Luter's election.

On June 20, the day after electing Luter, SBC voted to permit use of the designation "Great Commission" as an alternative to "Southern" for congregations desiring a break from the geographical and historical eponym. Nominated by David Crosby of New Orleans' First Baptist Church, 
Luter succeeded Bryant Wright of Johnson Ferry Baptist Church in Marietta, Georgia.

Luter cited "to improve racial harmony" as his goal on his reelection to the second (and final) year of SBC presidency.

On June 11, 2014, Dr. Ronnie Floyd of Cross Church in Arkansas succeeded Rev. Luter as SBC president.

Earlier ministry
Luter had begun his ministry in 1977 in New Orleans' Lower Ninth Ward after he suffered a motorcycle accident. He has credited his motorcycling misadventure as his "road to Damascus moment"—his analogy to the conversion of Saul of Tarsus. He began as a street preacher at the corner of Caffin and Galvez. During his streetpreaching days Luter observed a need to draw men, particularly fathers, into his evangelistic appeal by urging events which attract male interest, on one occasion, in 1981, hosting a gathering for a pay-per-view televised boxing match between Thomas Hearns and Sugar Ray Leonard. His first sermon in a churchbuilding was in 1983 at New Orleans' Law Street Missionary Baptist Church. He was a staff minister at the city's Greater Liberty Baptist Church when he learned of the opening at Franklin Avenue and sought the job.

Franklin Avenue Baptist Church
Luter is senior minister of the Franklin Avenue Baptist Church in New Orleans. He has been with the congregation since 1986, when it had 65 members. Before Hurricane Katrina struck in 2005, the congregation had grown to over 7000 members, making it the largest congregation affiliated with SBC in Louisiana. Luter led the rebuilding of the membership after the diaspora from Katrina, and as of his election to the Southern Baptist presidency the congregation had 5000 members. Luter's strategy for congregational growth is rooted in his concept "FRANgelism"—the acronym "FRAN" standing for friends, relatives, associates, and neighbors in acts of networking people into the life of the congregation.

Personal life
Luter was the middle child of five siblings and, after his parents divorced, was largely brought up single-handedly by his seamstress mother Viola Luter. In 1980 Fred Luter married Elizabeth W. Luter. The couple has two children: daughter Kimberly Ann "Kim" Luter was born in 1982; son Fred J. "Chip" Luter III, born 1985, is a graduate of Dallas Baptist University and is also a Baptist minister. Elizabeth Luter (born 1956) is involved in LifeWay Women's Conferences.

See also
List of Southern Baptist Convention affiliated people
Southern Baptist Convention
Southern Baptist Convention Presidents

Notes

1956 births
Living people
African-American Baptist ministers
Baptist ministers from the United States
Hurricane Katrina recovery in New Orleans
People from New Orleans
Southern Baptist ministers
Southern Baptist Convention presidents
Baptists from Louisiana
21st-century African-American politicians
21st-century American politicians
20th-century African-American politicians
20th-century American politicians